Maledictosuchus is an extinct genus of marine crocodyliform belonging to the family  Metriorhynchidae. It is the most basal member of the Rhacheosaurini Tribe with a relatively short body length, measuring  based on the type specimen.

Distribution
Genus includes two species: the type species M. riclaensis, described on the basis of fossils found in Ricla, Spain, and M. nuyivijanan, known from the Late Jurassic (Kimmeridgian) Sabinal Formation (Tlaxiaco Basin, Oaxaca, Mexico).

References

Prehistoric pseudosuchian genera
Prehistoric marine crocodylomorphs
Middle Jurassic crocodylomorphs
Late Jurassic crocodylomorphs
Fossils of Spain
Fossils of Mexico